Willie Smith (February 11, 1939 – January 16, 2006) was an American Major League Baseball pitcher and outfielder. He also played two seasons in Japan for the Nankai Hawks (1972–73). He was born in Anniston, Alabama.

Smith began his professional career with the Negro league Birmingham Black Barons, where he was selected to play in the East–West All-Star Game in 1958 and 1959.

Smith was a highly regarded pitching prospect in the Detroit farm system. In 1963, playing for the Triple-A Syracuse Chiefs, he led the International League in winning percentage (.875) with a 14–2 won/loss mark, and posted a 2.11 earned run average. He also batted .380 (30 hits in 79 at bats), with one home run and 13 runs batted in.

Smith was still plying his trade on the mound when he was traded to the Angels for Julio Navarro on April 28, 1964. He had compiled a 1–4 record with an earned run average of 2.84 with the Angels in 31⅔ innings pitched when Halo manager Bill Rigney shifted Smith to the outfield to get his bat in the lineup on a daily basis. Smith responded by hitting .301 that season (his career-best batting average) with 11 home runs and 51 RBI.

Smith is perhaps best remembered by Chicago baseball fans for his dramatic extra inning walk-off home run at Wrigley Field on Opening Day, April 8, 1969, resulting in a Cubs win over the Philadelphia Phillies. He was traded by the Cubs to the Reds for Danny Breeden on November 30, 1970.

In nine seasons, he played in 691 games and had 1,654 at bats, 410 hits, 46 home runs, 211 RBI, 20 stolen bases, 107 walks, and a slash line of .248/.295/.395. His record as a pitcher was 2–4 with a 3.10 ERA in 29 games; in 61 innings pitched spread over three MLB seasons, he allowed 60 hits and 24 bases on balls, with 39 strikeouts.

Smith died of an apparent heart attack in his hometown at the age of 66.

References

External links

1939 births
2006 deaths
African-American baseball players
Águilas Cibaeñas players
American expatriate baseball players in the Dominican Republic
American expatriate baseball players in Japan
Baseball players from Alabama
Birmingham Black Barons players
California Angels players
Chicago Cubs players
Cincinnati Reds players
Cleveland Indians players
Detroit Tigers players
Duluth-Superior Dukes players
Indianapolis Indians players
Knoxville Smokies players
Los Angeles Angels players
Major League Baseball left fielders
Major League Baseball pitchers
Nankai Hawks players
Portland Beavers players
Sportspeople from Anniston, Alabama
Syracuse Chiefs players
20th-century African-American sportspeople
21st-century African-American people